
Mega Top 30 is a Dutch music chart compiled by SoundAware and broadcast every Saturday from 14:00 - 16:00 on NPO 3FM. It originally started on November 30, 1963, as the Tijd voor Teenagers Top 10. Throughout the years, the chart has had several names and lengths:

History
The first broadcast in its current format was on Friday May 23, 1969. The show was presented by Joost den Draayer. Desmond Dekker & The Aces were the chart toppers at that time with "The Israelites". From December 4, 1970, the chart was compiled by the NOS. Den Draayer kept presenting the show until April 2, 1971, when Felix Meurders replaced him. From 1978 until 2005 the year end charts were based on sales.

The radio-broadcast remained on Radio 3 and since 5th. December 1985 the chart has been broadcast by the TROS. Only during the period of 1993–1995, the show was broadcast by other broadcasting organizations. From 2007 until November 2014 the chart was hosted by Bart Arens. His place was taken by Paul Rabbering. Barend van Deelen was the presenter from 2015 until 2017. The current presenter is Olivier Bakker.

On television, the chart was used by TopPop from 1974 until 1978 and from 1982 until 1988. In the period 2000-2006 Top of the Pops NL used the public chart.

Since May 2004, Music Factory, MTV and NPO 3FM airplay data have also been used in the composition of the chart. Exactly one year later, digital downloads were also included. The chart that made use of single sales figures only kept on existing though, under the name of B2B Single Top 100. Since 2012 streaming data has been included in the composition of the chart.

The chart is compiled by SoundAware. Current composition is based on:
 streaming data from Spotify
 download data
 radio airplay on Dutch radio stations: NPO Radio 1, NPO Radio 2, NPO 3FM, 100%NL, Q-music, Radio 538, Radio 10, Radio Veronica, Sky Radio and Slam FM.

Books

See also
MegaCharts
Single Top 100
Dutch Top 40

References

External links
Mega Top 50 website at 3FM 
Samples of the first broadcast 

Dutch record charts